Limnomedusa may refer to:
 Limnomedusae, an order of jellyfish within the subclass Trachylinae
 Limnomedusa (genus), a genus of South American frog, containing only the species Limnomedusa macroglossa